The Anargharāghava (Devanagari )  is a dramatised retelling of the Ramayana, and one of the most challenging pieces of classical Sanskrit poetry.  

Because of its elegant style, learned allusions and often striking imagery, the poem has been a great favourite among pandits , although it received little attention in the West until recently. The well-known epic story of Rama’s exploits is presented as a series of political intrigues and battles, and contrasted with lyrical passages of various kinds: on love and war, pride and honor, gods and demons, rites and myths, regions and cities of ancient India.

The play has little action — most fights and events take place behind the scenes or between acts — focussing instead  on diction and other elements of dramatic representation, reminiscent of the Keralan Kutiyattam tradition. Although Kutiyattam representations are envisaged for dramas with more action than the Anargharāghava, actual performances — which normally include only one episode of a play at one go — often resemble spectacular chanting recitations of poetry interspersed with well-choreographed movements rather than what one would normally call theatre.

Murāri's emphasis on writing a play rather than a series of beautiful stanzas is also seen in the numerous allusions to plays and theatre.
In the Prakrit-Sanskrit prelude  of Act 4, entitled , Mālyavan, the great intriguer of the demons, Rāvaṇa’s minister, is angry with Vishvāmitra, who is directing a ‘bad drama’, a play which is altogether against Mālyavan’s will. The expression is made more explicit by one of the commentators, Vishnubhatta, who gives the following paraphrase: he Vishvāmitra directs everything himself, just as a stage-manager does. 
In presenting the Rama-story as a story of intrigues, Murāri follows the tradition of Bhavabhuti’s Mahāvīracarita, but renews it with his parallels from the world of stage.

Translations 
Anargharāghavam with Sanskrit commentary and Hindi translation by Rāmacandra Miśra, Varanasi: Chowkhamba Vidya Bhawan, 1960.
Anargharāghava: Das Schauspiel vom kostbaren Raghuspross. Einführung und Übersetzung by Karin Steiner, Drama und Theater in Südasien, Wiesbaden: Harrassowitz Verlag, 1997.
Rama Beyond Price by Judit Törzsök, Clay Sanskrit Library, 2006.

See also
Sanskrit drama
Sanskrit literature

References 

Viṣṇubhaṭṭaviracitā Anargharāghavapañcikā: The Commentary of Viṣṇubhaṭṭa on the Anargharāghava of Murāri by Judit Törzsök, Critical edition, Vol I: The Commentary of Viṣṇubhaṭṭa; Vol. II: The Anargharāghava of Murāri as Read by Viṣṇubhaṭṭa, Notes, Appendices by Harinarayana Bhat, Journal of the American Oriental Society, Vol. 123, No. 2 (Apr. – Jun., 2003), pp. 431–434.

External links 
  scans of an 1887 edition, Nirnaysagar press, Mumbai.

Sanskrit plays